Citizens UK is a grassroots alliance of many local communities working together. Citizens UK has 17 chapters across the UK made up of local institutions, including schools, universities, churches, mosques, synagogues, parent groups, health trusts, charities, and unions. They have won over £1.5 billion of wages through the UK Living Wage campaign, winning a legal cap on the cost of credit, and ending the detention of children for immigration purposes. Projects include the Living Wage Foundation, Parents and Communities Together (PACT), and Sponsor Refugees.

It was started as London Citizens in 1996, and came to national prominence during the 2010 United Kingdom general election when all three leaders of the UK's three largest political parties addressed a large meeting of its members in what it billed as the "fourth debate", in reference to the three TV debates. The event was notable for Gordon Brown giving what was widely described as his best speech of the campaign.

In September 2018, Matthew Bolton became the new Executive Director of Citizens UK after Neil Jameson CBE stepped down.

History  

Citizens UK formed in 1989, formerly as Citizens Organising Foundation (COF).  

In 2001 the real Living Wage campaign was launched by TELCO Citizens. Starting as a meeting in East London, members from schools, mosques, churches and other local civil society institutions came together to discuss issues in their local community. Low pay was one of the key issues that consistently came up. At the time, the London minimum wage was just £3.70 an hour which meant some people were working multiple jobs and still struggling to make ends meet. Leaders organised rallies, charity music gigs and actions calling for employers to pay all staff and contracted staff a real Living Wage. A march down the Mile End road was organised calling for all staff working in East London hospitals to be a paid a Living Wage. These hospitals were among the first employers to join the movement, followed by local schools and big City firms.

The campaign has since won over £1.3 billion of additional wages, lifting over 260,000 people out of working poverty.

Political philosophy 

Citizens' brand of community organising is distinctive because it deliberately sets out to build permanent alliances of citizens to exercise power in society. It sees its role in the UK's political system as determinant of the distinction between Civil Society from the State and the Market. In a totalitarian Society all three may virtually coincide. In a fully democratic society the three will be distinct. Where the state and the market become predominant, even in a democracy, civil society is reduced on the one hand to voting and volunteering and on the other to consuming. This can undermine democracies because the sense of citizenship and agency becomes weak and ineffective. In other words, Civil Society becomes powerless. Community organising and the role of the professional Community Organiser is working out how to take back power from the State and the Market by holding them accountable. The state and the market cannot operate without moral values and direction. It is not the role of the state or the market to determine those values. In a democratic society there has to be a genuine public discourse concerning justice and the common good.

Citizens UK created a Master's course in Community Organising in affiliation with Queen Mary University.

From London Citizens to Citizens UK 

London Citizens is the largest civil alliance in the Citizens UK network. The four London chapters are The East London Communities Organisation, better known as "TELCO", formed in 1996 at a founding assembly gathering over 1,300 people from 30 different institutions. The other London Chapters are South London Citizens established in 2004, West London Citizens established in 2005, and North London Citizens established in 2011.

London Citizens' most high-profile campaigns included those to establish a London living wage, an urban Community Land Trust and CitySafe havens in high streets as a way of tackling knife crime and street violence.

London Citizens has in its four chapters over 240 organisations in membership. In local neighbourhoods small actions are undertaken such as those to prevent a factory from contaminating the area with noxious smells, stopping drug dealing in school neighbourhoods and getting safe road crossings established. Over time larger campaigns were undertaken. Before Mayoral elections for the Greater London Authority in 2000, 2004 and 2008 major Accountability Assemblies were held with the main mayoral candidates. They were asked to support London Citizens and work with them on issues such as London Living Wage; an amnesty for undocumented migrants; safer cities initiatives and development of community land trust housing. South London Citizens held a citizens enquiry into the working of the Home Office department at Lunar House and its impact on the lives of refugees and migrants. This resulted in the building of a new visitor centre at Lunar House in Croydon.

Strangers into Citizens 

Strangers into Citizens was a political advocacy campaign from February 2007 to May 2010 by London Citizens. The campaign called for undocumented migrants in the United Kingdom to receive a work permit if they had been resident for four years. The campaign became definitively and formally defunct in the year 2013.

The campaign was organised by Austen Ivereigh, a former director of public affairs for the Archbishop of Westminster, Cardinal Cormac Murphy-O'Connor, and as such had strong links with amongst others the Cardinal Archbishop, Westminster Cathedral, the Catholic Bishops' Conference of England and Wales and the Catholic Herald newspaper, all three being enthusiastic supporters of the political advocacy campaign.

The campaign attempted to influence the policies of the political parties and candidates in both the 2008 London mayoral election and in the 2010 general election. During the London mayoral election, the campaign was supportively endorsed by the Liberal Democrats and the Labour and Conservative candidates for the Mayoralty of London in their personal capacity, being Ken Livingstone and Boris Johnson respectively.

Campaigns

Living Wage Foundation 

Launched in 2001, the Living Wage campaign calls for every worker in the country to earn enough to provide their family with the essentials of life. As a result of the campaign's success, other cities began to adopt the campaign and Citizens UK set up the Living Wage Foundation (LWF) in 2011 to provide companies with intelligence and accreditation. Rates are independently calculated every year to meet the real cost of living with an hourly London rate and another rate for the UK, outside London. In the capital it is set by the Greater London Authority.The rate outside London is calculated by the Minimum Income Standard team at Loughborough University, supported by the Joseph Rowntree Foundation. Since launching the campaign has accredited almost 10,000 employers to pay the living wage and has won over £1.3 billion of additional wages, lifting over 260,000 people out of working poverty.

People's Olympic Legacy 

When it was announced that London would bid to be the host city for the 2012 Olympic Games, Citizens lobbied to gain a lasting legacy for Londoners from the billions of pound to be spent. Following on from hundreds of one-to-one meetings and a listening campaign across member institutions, in 2004 London Citizens signed an agreement with the London 2012 bid team, which specified what the people of East London could expect in return for their support in hosting the Olympic Games. The People's Promises, as they are known, had the following demands:

 2012 permanently affordable homes for local people through a Community Land Trust and mutual home ownership.
 Money from the Olympic development to be set aside to improve local schools and the health service.
 The University of East London to be main higher education beneficiary of the sports legacy and to consider becoming a Sports Centre of Excellence.
 At least £2m set aside immediately for a Construction Academy to train up local people.
 That at least 30% of jobs are set aside for local people.
 That the Lower Lea Valley is designated a 'Living Wage Zone' and all jobs guaranteed a living wage The Olympic Delivery Authority, the London Organising Committee for the Olympic Games and the Olympic Legacy Company work with London Citizens to ensure that these promises are delivered.

Citizens UK General Election Assembly 

In May 2010 Citizens UK held a General Election Assembly at the Methodist Central Hall Westminster with 2,500 people from member institutions and the world media present. This event was three days before the election and was considered to be the most dynamic and electric event of the election campaign. Citizens UK had negotiated to have David Cameron, Nick Clegg and Gordon Brown as the leaders of the three main political parties attend. Each candidate for Prime Minister was questioned on stage concerning their willingness to work with Citizens UK if elected. Each undertook to work with Citizens UK and come to future assemblies to give account of work achieved. In particular they agreed to work to introduce the Living Wage and to end the practice of holding children of refugee families in detention.

Independent Asylum Commission 

Citizens UK set up the Independent Asylum Commission to investigate widespread concern about the way refugees and asylum seekers were being treated by the UK Borders Agency. The report made a series of over 200 recommendations for change which are still being negotiated. In the lead up to the 2010 General Election a major campaign was mounted over the number of children being held in detention with their families seeking refugee status. Over 1,000 children were being detained annually. Promises to end this practice were made by all three political leaders at the General Election Accountability Assembly held by Citizens UK in May 2010 at Westminster Central Hall.  This resulted in the ending of the practice of holding children of refugee families in detention by the Coalition government and a law was passed in 2014 to prohibit this.

Sponsor Refugees & Community Sponsorship scheme 
At the height of the Syrian refugee crisis in September 2015, following the public outrage at images of Alan Kurdi washed up on the shores of Turkey, Citizens UK called for the introduction of sponsorship of refugees based on the Canadian model of community sponsorship. Just weeks later, the then Home Secretary, Theresa May, announced that the Home Office would look at the idea. Citizens UK became one of the leading civil society partners helping the Government to design and produce the community sponsorship scheme. This was launched in July 2016. Citizens UK Foundation for Community Sponsorship of Refugees (Sponsor Refugees) was established in October 2017 – and has been working to promote the scheme and to support pioneer groups to become sponsors ever since.

Institute for Community Organising 
Citizens UK set up the Institute for Community Organising (ICO) as part of its Centre for Civil Society established in 2010 in response to growing demands for its training. The ICO is the first operating division of the Centre and was established to offer a series of training opportunities for those who wish to make community organising a full or part-time career and also for Community Leaders who wish to learn the broad philosophy and skills of community organising and who are in a position to put them into practice in their institutions and neighbourhoods. The Institute provides training and consultancy on a commercial basis to other agencies which wish to employ the skills and techniques of community organising in their institutions. The ICO has an Academic Advisory Board and an International Professional Advisory Body drawn from the global network of Community Organising Institutes in the UK (Citizens UK), USA (Industrial Areas Foundation) and Germany (DICO).

References

External links 

Community organizations
Progressivism in the United Kingdom
Organisations based in London
Recipients of the European Citizen's Prize